James E. Tobin (born 1956) is an American author of books of popular history and biography, including Ernie Pyle's War: America's Eyewitness to World War II (Free Press, 1997), which won the National Book Critics Circle Award in the biography/autobiography category. Since 2006 he has been a professor of journalism at Miami University in Oxford, Ohio. 

His other books include To Conquer the Air: The Wright Brothers and the Great Race for Flight (Free Press 2003); Great Projects (Free Press 2001); and The Man He Became: How FDR Defied Polio to Win the Presidency (Simon & Schuster, 2013). In 2021, his retelling of the story of Roosevelt and polio for young-adult readers was published as Master of His Fate: Roosevelt's Rise from Polio to the Presidency (Henry Holt). In the same year, he published Sing to the Colors: A Writer Explores Two Centuries at the University of Michigan (University of Michigan Press, 2021), a collection of narratives about the history of his alma mater. 

With the syndicated cartoonist Dave Coverly, Tobin has also written two picture books for children, Sue MacDonald Had a Book (Henry Holt, 2009) and The Very Inappropriate Word (Henry Holt, 2013).

Early life and education
Tobin was born in Pontiac, Michigan, in 1956, and educated in the public schools of Birmingham, Michigan. At the University of Michigan, where he earned a B.A. with a major in history in 1978, he was co-editor-in-chief of the student newspaper, The Michigan Daily. He pursued graduate studies in history at Michigan, earning the Ph.D. in 1986. His doctoral dissertation, overseen by the American historian Sidney Fine, was "Why We Fight: Versions of the American Purpose in World War II," a study of interpretations of the U.S. war effort developed by, among others, President Franklin Roosevelt, the advertising industry, the filmmaker Frank Capra and the war correspondent Ernie Pyle.

Career

As a reporter at the Detroit News, Tobin wrote general-assignment stories for two years, then covered two specialized beats — higher education, then medicine. While working for the News, he spent four years researching and writing a biography of the war correspondent Ernie Pyle. He conducted research in Pyle's personal papers at Indiana University and the Ernie Pyle State Historic Site and interviewed veterans who had known Pyle. 

Tobin left the Detroit News in 1998 to begin work on a book about the Wright brothers and their rivals in the competition to develop the first heavier-than-air aircraft. It was published in 2003, the centennial of the Wrights' first flight at Kitty Hawk, North Carolina, as To Conquer the Air: The Wright Brothers and the Great Race for Flight. (Free Press, 2003.) In the meantime, he published a companion volume to the PBS 2001 documentary series "Great Projects: The Building of America." He also edited and provided commentary for another companion book to a PBS series, Reporting America at War: An Oral History (Hyperion, 2003).

His next major project was a narrative account of Franklin Roosevelt's struggle with the aftermath of poliomyelitis from 1921 to 1932, based chiefly on archival research at the Franklin D. Roosevelt Library in Hyde Park, New York. It was published by Simon & Schuster in 2013 as The Man He Became: How FDR Defied Polio to Win the Presidency. In 2021 he published a wholly new version for young-adult readers, Master of His Fate: Roosevelt's Rise from Polio to the Presidency (Henry Holt).

Tobin has written often about the history of the University of Michigan, chiefly for websites and magazines published by the University. A collection of these articles and two additional stories and commentary, Sing to the Colors: A Writer Explores Two Centuries at the University of Michigan (University of Michigan Press, 2021), was published by the University of Michigan Press.

Awards and honors

 Ernie Pyle's War: National Book Critics Circle Award in biography/autobiography, 1997; New York Times Notable Book of 1997. 
 To Conquer the Air: J. Anthony Lukas Work-in-Progress Award, 2000; Great Lakes Book Award. In the Wall Street Journal, the historian William Rosen listed To Conquer the Air as one of "Five Best" books about invention. 
 The Man He Became: Fellowship, National Endowment for the Humanities (2008); runner-up, Chautauqua Book Prize (2014).

Personal life
Tobin and his wife, Leesa Erickson Tobin, an archivist and researcher, live in Michigan.

References

External links

1956 births
Year of birth uncertain
The Detroit News people
American newspaper reporters and correspondents
American biographers
American children's writers
Miami University faculty
Fellows of the National Endowment for the Humanities
Living people
 University of Michigan alumni